Sri Dharmasthala Mahathme is a 1962 Indian Kannada film directed and produced by D. Shankar Singh. The film stars H. T. Urs, Dikki Madhava Rao, Shamarao and H. R. Shastry in the lead roles. The film has musical score by M. Venkataraju.

Cast

H. T. Urs
Dikki Madhava Rao
Shamarao
H. R. Shastry
Sorat Ashwath
Krishna Shastry
Shivashankar
D. N. Wadeyar
Sriranga
Srikanth
M. Ramarao
Mahadevappa
Mallikarjunappa
Venkatappa
Venkataramaiah
Sham Singh
Rajendra Prasad
H. R. Hanumantha Rao
Jorge
Anantharam Maccheri
Ankappa
Nanjundappa
Prathima Devi
Indira Acharya	
C. K. Kalavathi
Chandthara
Jayanthi
Kalyani

References

External links 
 

1962 films
1960s Kannada-language films
Films scored by M. Venkataraju